Tümen-Ölziin Mönkhbayar (born 27 August 1973) is a Mongolian wrestler. He competed in the men's freestyle 76 kg at the 2000 Summer Olympics.

References

External links
 

1973 births
Living people
Mongolian male sport wrestlers
Olympic wrestlers of Mongolia
Wrestlers at the 2000 Summer Olympics
Place of birth missing (living people)
Wrestlers at the 1998 Asian Games
Asian Games competitors for Mongolia
21st-century Mongolian people
20th-century Mongolian people